The Vela class is a series of 4 container ships built for CMA CGM. The ships were built by Daewoo Shipbuilding and Marine Engineering in South Korea. The ships have a maximum theoretical capacity of around 11,262 twenty-foot equivalent units (TEU).

List of ships

References 

Container ship classes
Ships built by Daewoo Shipbuilding & Marine Engineering